Aqaba or Al Aqaba or Al Aqabah may refer to:

Place
 Aqaba, Jordan
 Aqabah, West Bank 
 The Gulf of Aqaba, at the northern end of the Red Sea

Events
 Second pledge at al-Aqabah